Ellen McCulloch-Lovell was the president of Marlboro College from 2004 until 2015. A graduate of Bennington College, McCullouch-Lovell served as Chief of Staff to Vermont Senator Patrick Leahy for ten years. Under the Clinton administration, she worked as executive director of the President's Committee on the Arts and Humanities, deputy chief of staff to the First Lady, and deputy assistant to the President and advisor to the First Lady on the Millennium Project.

She was named as president of Marlboro College in 2003 and began her duties in April 2004.

She later joined the Board of Trustees at Windham Foundation.

References

External links
  Marlboro College Meet the President
  Marlboro College Full Profile of President
 

Heads of universities and colleges in the United States
Bennington College alumni
Employees of the United States Senate
Living people
Year of birth missing (living people)